The Donghe Group is a Lower Cretaceous geologic formation in China. Fossil theropod tracks have been reported from the formation. It predominantly consists of conglomerate, alongside sandstone, siltstone and shale.

See also

 List of dinosaur-bearing rock formations
 List of stratigraphic units with theropod tracks

Footnotes

References
 Weishampel, David B.; Dodson, Peter; and Osmólska, Halszka (eds.): The Dinosauria, 2nd, Berkeley: University of California Press. 861 pp. .

Geologic groups of Asia
Geologic formations of China
Lower Cretaceous Series of Asia
Cretaceous China
Ichnofossiliferous formations